The Sultanate of Utetera  (1860–1887), also referred as Tippu Tip's state, was one of the Arab sultanates established in eastern Africa. It was a 19th century short-lived state ruled by the infamous Swahili slave trader Tippu Tip (Hamad al Murjebi) and his son Sefu. The capital of the state was the town of Kasongo. Tippu Tip's controlled territory reached as far to eastern Kasai and to Aruwimi Basin in the west. 

By the mid 19th century, the Arab traders arrived from the east African coast, in what was under the control of the Sultanate of Zanzibar. While the Arab traders were already engaged in important and different trade activities, they continued searching for ivory, gold and slaves. Arab settlements in the African interior and trade stations were to be found in many locations, including the most important trade stations at Lualaba, Nyangwe and Kasongo. The Arab traders and explorers were not interested in converting locals to their faith, nor did they seek to bond with local chiefs, but rather to establish trading stations and regular flow of trading goods to Zanzibar.

References 

Former sultanates
Former countries in Africa